Rolling Hills Estates is a city in Los Angeles County, California, United States. On the northern side of the Palos Verdes Peninsula, facing Torrance, Rolling Hills Estates is mostly residential. Incorporated in 1957, Rolling Hills Estates has many horse paths. The population was 8,067 at the 2010 census, up from 7,676 at the 2000 census. In 2018, the population rose to 8,141.

History

Rolling Hills Estates was historically part of Rancho San Pedro. The area eventually became known as Rancho El Elastico prior to incorporating as Rolling Hills Estates. It was Los Angeles County's 60th municipality, incorporated on September 18, 1957.

Geography
Rolling Hills Estates is located on the Palos Verdes Peninsula.

Demographics

2010
The 2010 US Census reported that Rolling Hills Estates had a population of 8,067. The racial makeup of Rolling Hills Estates was 5,463 (67.7%) White (63.6% Non-Hispanic White), 109 (1.4%) African American, 19 (0.2%) Native American, 2,007 (24.9%) Asian, 8 (0.1%) Pacific Islander, 120 (1.5%) from other races, and 341 (4.2%) from two or more races. Hispanic or Latino of any race were 499 people (6.2%).

The whole population lived in households, no one lived in non-institutionalized group quarters and no one was institutionalized.

There were 2,965 households, 1,023 (34.5%) had children under the age of 18 living in them, 2,100 (70.8%) were opposite-sex married couples living together, 192 (6.5%) had a female householder with no husband present, 83 (2.8%) had a male householder with no wife present.  There were 45 (1.5%) unmarried opposite-sex partnerships, and 23 (0.8%) same-sex married couples or partnerships. 512 households (17.3%) were one person and 353 (11.9%) had someone living alone who was 65 or older. The average household size was 2.72.  There were 2,375 families (80.1% of households); the average family size was 3.07.

The age distribution was 1,890 people (23.4%) under the age of 18, 417 people (5.2%) aged 18 to 24, 1,211 people (15.0%) aged 25 to 44, 2,680 people (33.2%) aged 45 to 64, and 1,869 people (23.2%) who were 65 or older. The median age was 48.5 years. For every 100 females, there were 93.0 males. For every 100 females age 18 and over, there were 89.2 males.

There were 3,100 housing units at an average density of 857.9 per square mile, of the occupied units 2,714 (91.5%) were owner-occupied and 251 (8.5%) were rented. The homeowner vacancy rate was 1.8%; the rental vacancy rate was 4.9%. 7,302 people (90.5% of the population) lived in owner-occupied housing units and 765 people (9.5%) lived in rental housing units.

According to the 2010 United States Census, Rolling Hills Estates had a median household income of $143,958, with 3.5% of the population living below the federal poverty line.

2000
At the 2000 census there were 7,676 people in 2,806 households, including 2,334 families, in the city. The population density was 2,139.1 inhabitants per square mile (825.5/km). The racial makeup of the city was 73.9% White, 20.3% Asian, 1.2% African American, 0.3% Native American, 0.1% Pacific Islander, 1.0% from other races, and 3.3% from two or more races. Hispanic or Latino of any race were 4.8%.

Of the 2,806 households 33.7% had children under the age of 18 living with them, 74.6% were married couples living together, 6.0% had a female householder with no husband present, and 16.8% were non-families. 15.0% of households were one person and 7.9% were one person aged 65 or older. The average household size was 2.73 and the average family size was 3.02.

The age distribution was 24.3% under the age of 18, 4.7% from 18 to 24, 21.2% from 25 to 44, 30.9% from 45 to 64, and 18.9% 65 or older. The median age was 45 years. For every 100 females, there were 94.4 males. For every 100 females age 18 and over, there were 91.3 males.

The median household income was $109,010 and the median family income  was $119,974. Males had a median income of $100,000+ versus $52,295 for females. The per capita income for the city was $51,849. About 1.1% of families and 1.7% of the population were below the poverty line, including 2.6% of those under age 18 and none of those age 65 or over.

Ethnic groups
By 1992 many wealthier Korean Americans moved to the Palos Verdes Peninsula. Rolling Hills Estates was among five cities in the South Bay that had the largest increases in ethnic Koreans from 1980 to 1990. In 1990, 200 ethnic Koreans lived in Rolling Hills Estates, a 160% increase from the 1980 figure of 77 ethnic Koreans.

Education

Rolling Hills Country Day School is a private school that serves grades K–8. Chadwick School, a well-known K–12 private school, is located on Academy Hill, an unincorporated neighborhood administered by the county, but is actually just blocks away from the Rolling Hills Estates city hall and serves the entire Palos Verdes Peninsula area, including Rolling Hills Estates.

The Palos Verdes Library District operates the Peninsula Center Library in Rolling Hills Estates.

Nishiyamato Academy of California opened in April 1993. It was originally located in the former Dapplegray School building in Rolling Hills Estates. It was founded by Ryotaro Tanose, a Japanese Diet member, as a sister school of the Nishiyamato Gakuen Junior High School and High School in Kawai, Nara Prefecture, Japan. Currently it is located in Lomita.

Economy

Top employers
According to the city's 2009 Comprehensive Annual Financial Report, the top employers in the city are:

Retail
The city contains The Promenade on the Peninsula mall, originally an enclosed regional mall with two department store anchors, May Company California and Bullocks Wilshire, as well as the Peninsula Center, which originally had a Buffums department store.

Representation

The Los Angeles County Sheriff's Department (LASD) operates the Lomita Station in Lomita, serving Rolling Hills Estates.

The Los Angeles County Department of Health Services operates the Torrance Health Center in Harbor Gateway, Los Angeles, near Torrance and serving Rolling Hills Estates.

References

External links
 

Cities in Los Angeles County, California
Palos Verdes Peninsula
Populated places established in 1957
Incorporated cities and towns in California
South Bay, Los Angeles
1957 establishments in California